The Real Housewives of Jersey (abbreviated RHOJersey) is a British reality television series that premiered on ITVBe on 28 December 2020. Developed as the second British installment of The Real Housewives franchise, it aired two seasons and focuses on the personal and professional lives of several women living in Jersey.

The shows cast members were Ashley Cairney, Hedi Green, Jane Rayner, Kate Taylor, Margaret Thompson, Mia Ledbury, Tessa Hartman, Sarha Courtnay and Karen Loderick.

Overview and casting
ITVBe officially commissioned the series in August 2020 following the success of the British instalment of the Real Housewives franchise, The Real Housewives of Cheshire. Filming began that same month. The show focused on the lives of the residents of Jersey and showcased the lifestyle of those who live on the Channel Island.

In total, the series has been streamed 2.26 million times on ITV's catch-up service, ITV Hub.
 
On 29 April 2021, ITV confirmed filming began for the second series. Green and Rayner did not return in a full-time capacity, but made guest appearances during the season. Sarha Courtnay and Karen Loderick joined the returning cast as new housewives, with Loderick joining in episode 1 and Courtnay in episode 2. The second series premiered on 27 December 2021 and was followed by a reunion show, which was recorded soon after filming for season 2 wrapped.
 On 27 February 2022, Hartmann departed the show after two seasons.  On 5 May 2022, ITV announced that they had no plans to renew the series for a third season.

Timeline of cast members

Episodes

Series 1 (2020–21)

Series 2 (2021–22)
Episodes aired weekly starting 27 December 2021, however on the premier date of the first episode, the entire series became available on the ITV Hub.

References 

2020 British television series debuts
2020s British reality television series
2022 British television series endings
ITV reality television shows
British television series based on American television series
English-language television shows
The Real Housewives
Women in Jersey